Rupert García (born in 1941 in San Joaquin Valley of French Camp, California) is an American Chicano visual artist and professor. He is known as a painter, pastellist, and screen printer. In the 1960s, as a leader, he led a movement against 'Yankee' culture through the production and use of posters, and screen prints. In 1970, he co-founded the Galería de la Raza in San Francisco.

Biography 
Rupert García was born in 1941 in French Camp, an agricultural town. He growing up in the nearby city of Stockton.

Education 
García studied painting at a junior college, and enrolled at San Francisco State College (now San Francisco State University) for pop-art. He graduated from with a BFA degree in painting in 1968. During his study in San Francisco State College, he joined the anti-war movement and participated in the 1968 student strike organized by the Third World Liberation Front. In 1981, he has received an MFA degree in printmaking, an MA degree in art history and a PhD in art education from the University of California, Berkeley.

Career 

García served in the United States Air Force during the Vietnam War, participating in Operation Rolling Thunder. During his study in San Francisco State College, he joined the anti-war movement and participated in the 1968 student strike organized by the Third World Liberation Front. He stopped painting until the mid-70s, instead creating political posters denouncing violence against Latinos and Blacks in the United States. In 1968, he decided to stop painting and made political posters condemning violence against Latinos, blacks and other minorities in the United States. In 1988, he taught in San Jose State University, School of Art and Art History department and retired in 2010.  Since 2011 to present, he is the Professor Emeritus of Art, in San Jose State University. In 2011, he exhibited at the de Young museum. His work is in the collection of the Smithsonian American Art Museum, and the Achenbach Foundation for Graphic Arts.

Solo exhibition (2000–present):

Publications

References

External links 

 
Oral history interview with Rupert Garcia, 1995 Sept. 7-1996 June 24, from Archives of American Art, Smithsonian Institution

1941 births
People from French Camp, California
20th-century American printmakers
21st-century American printmakers
Painters from California
San Francisco State University alumni
San Jose State University faculty
Living people
Hispanic and Latino American artists